The Kew Gardens (Leases) Act 2019 (c. 25) is an Act of the Parliament of the United Kingdom. It allowed the Secretary of State to lease land on the grounds of the Royal Botanic Gardens, Kew. It was introduced to Parliament by Lord Gardiner of Kimble and Michael Gove from the Department for Environment, Food and Rural Affairs as a government bill.

Provisions
The provisions of the act include:
Allowing the Secretary of State the power to lease land on the grounds of Kew Gardens for a period up to 150 years.

Exempting such a lease from Section 5 of the Crown Lands Act 1702 (which limits the grants and leases of land owned by the Crown).

Preventing such a lease if it would have an adverse impact on either the "outstanding universal value" of the Gardens as a World Heritage Site or if it would impair the work of the Board of Trustees of the Gardens to carry out their functions and that of the Gardens under Section 24 of the National Heritage Act 1983 (which directs the Board to carry out research into, education about, care of and collect reference archives about plants).

See also

Kew Gardens
Non-departmental public body – the official designation of the Royal Botanic Gardens, Kew

References

United Kingdom Acts of Parliament 2019
Royal Botanic Gardens, Kew
Leasing
Law of the United Kingdom
Politics of the United Kingdom